Cloarec (Kloareg in Modern Breton) is a surname. Notable people with the surname include:

Françoise Cloarec (born 1957), French writer
Georges Cloarec (1932–1944), French resistant
Joël Cloarec (born 1966), French football player and manager
Nicolas Cloarec (born 1977), French football player
Pierre Cloarec (1909–1994), French road bicycle racer

References

Breton-language surnames